Eugéne Kracher (20 August 1909 – 7 February 1995) was a French wrestler. He competed in the men's Greco-Roman featherweight at the 1936 Summer Olympics.

References

External links
 

1909 births
1995 deaths
French male sport wrestlers
Olympic wrestlers of France
Wrestlers at the 1936 Summer Olympics
People from Sélestat
Sportspeople from Bas-Rhin